The Duncan class of 101-gun two-decker steam line-of-battle ships are considered by Professor Andrew Lambert to have been the "final statement of the British design progress" for steam two-deckers.  The class consisted of HMS Duncan and HMS Gibraltar.  The Bulwark class had identical hulls.  HMS Gibraltar was the last wooden steam line-of-battleship to commission as a private ship in the Royal Navy.

Design 

The first British steam 101-gun two-decker was the St Jean d'Acre, which was ordered and laid down in 1851 and was "the first ship that can be directly attributed to Sir Baldwin Walker's influence.  [She was] an expansion of the Agamemnon [91-guns], her superior qualities were developed in the succeeding Conqueror and Duncan classes of 101-gun ships."  The Duncan class were longer and broader versions of the Conqueror, which was a success as they were noticeably faster (see table below).

"The early steam battleships, such as the  Agamemnon, combined a measure of speed under sail or steam with similar manoeuvring powers to the sailing ships. While the post-war ships, from their greater length and finer lines, reached higher speeds they did so at the expense of the facility and precision of their response to the helm. New ships such as the Donegal, 101 and Renown, 91 were considered slow in their stays. This lack of handiness was emphasised by their operating in company with older ships such the St Jean d'Acre, 101 and James Watt, 91 which lacked speed, but tacked and wore far more easily. Lord Aukland had anticipated this problem in 1847."

Duncan and Gibraltar "presented a very different appearance from the Baroque splendour of the early Eighteenth Century, with their regular outline bereft of almost all embellishment beyond the elliptical stern gallery and the figurehead and painted in the severe black and white bands of the era.  These were the most striking and intimidating of all wooden warships, replacing elegance with majesty.  As such they were fitting precursors for the industrial architecture of the iron-clads."

** Note that Gibraltar's trial speed was undertaken without masts or stores.

Source: Lambert

Key dates 

The following table shows key dates for the Duncan class.

Career HMS Duncan 
 
10 February 1862: Reduction in the number of guns carried in peacetime to 89.

6 January 1864: Commanded by Captain Robert Gibson, flagship of Vice-Admiral James Hope, North America and West Indies.

Whilst serving on the North America and West Indies Station, Captain John Bythesea VC was carried on the books of Duncan as second captain from 1 April 1866 to Spring 1867, for special service as Naval Attaché in Washington.

15 June 1867 –  10 September 1867:  Commanded by Captain George Hancock, Coast Guard, Leith (Queensferry) (replacing Trafalgar).

10 September 1867 –  28 February 1870:  Commanded (until paying off) by Captain Charles Fellowes, Coast Guard, Leith (and flagship of Commodore of John Walker Tarleton's Coast Guard squadron comprising Duncan, Donegal, Revenge, Irresistible, Lion, Dauntless and Argus). HMS Repulse replaced Duncan as Coast Guard, Queensferry by 20 August 1870.

1 April 1873 –  1 January 1875:  Commanded by Captain George Willes Watson, Sheerness, replacing Pembroke.

1 January 1875:  Commanded by Captain Charles Thomas Curme, flagship of Vice-Admiral George Fowler Hastings, Sheerness.

From some time in 1878 – 1 January 1879: Commanded by Captain Thomas Bridgeman Lethbridge, Sheerness.

1 January 1879 –  27 July 1881:  Commanded by Captain Thomas Baker Martin Sulivan, Sheerness. Tenders: Hydra, Porcupine, Trent and Wildfire.

27 July 1881 –  31 December 1881: Commanded (until paying off at Sheerness) by Captain John D'Arcy, Sheerness (replaced by the Naval Barracks at Sheerness, renamed Duncan, but retained with a small crew as "saluting ship").

In 1890 she was Chatham. Machinery probably removed.  That year she was listed as harbour service and renamed Pembroke.

1895: Receiving ship, Chatham.

September 1905: was renamed Tenedos II, and commissioned in January 1906 as part of the new "Tenedos" training establishment for boy mechanician apprentices.

11 October 1910 On closure of the "Tenedos" establishment, sold for breaking up at London for £7,525.

Career HMS Gibraltar 

8 September 1863 –  December 1864: Commanded (from commissioning at Plymouth) by Captain James Charles Prevost, Mediterranean Fleet.

December 1864 – 12 January 1867: Commanded (until paying off at Plymouth) by Captain Robert Coote, Mediterranean Fleet.

1871 onwards: Lent to the Belfast Training Ship Committee as training ship for boys in Belfast.

1889: renamed Grampian.

16 March 1899: Sold to Castle for breaking up at Charlton.

Notes

References 

Lambert, Andrew   Battleships in Transition, the Creation of the Steam Battlefleet 1815–1860.  London: Conway Maritime Press, 1984.  
Warlow, B.   Shore Establishments of the Royal Navy, 2nd edition. Liskeard: Maritime Press, 2000.  
 
The Times newspaper, 11 February 1862.
Online History HMS Duncan
Online History HMS Gibraltar
Online History HMS Repulse
Online biography John Bythesea

Battleship classes
Ship classes of the Royal Navy
Ships of the line of the Royal Navy